Peggy Lee (born January 19, 1959), also known by her stage names Peggy Lee Leather, Lady X, and Thug, is an American professional wrestler.

Professional wrestling career

World Wrestling Federation
Peggy Lee competed in the World Wrestling Federation in the mid-1980s. In 1984, she formed a tag team with Wendi Richter and frequently challenged WWF Women's Tag Team Champions Velvet McIntyre and Princess Victoria. By 1985, Leather and Richter split up. Richter became a face and won the WWF Women's Championship. Leather challenged Richter for the title, but was unsuccessful.

American Wrestling Association
After leaving the WWF, she competed in Florida Championship Wrestling as Peggy Lee Pringle, the sister of Percy Pringle. She engaged in a feud with Mad Maxine, who had been battling Percy. She then began working for the American Wrestling Association as Peggy Lee Leather and challenged Madusa Miceli for the AWA World Women's Championship. She also competed in a lingerie battle royal at the AWA SuperClash III pay-per-view event on December 13, 1988.

Independent circuit and World Championship Wrestling
Leather also worked for David McLane. She competed in his nationally televised professional women's wrestling league, Powerful Women of Wrestling (POWW). During her time in POWW, she had a notable feud with her former WWF tag team partner Wendi Richter. She also feuded with long-time adversary Bambi.

In 1990, she briefly competed in World Championship Wrestling and was defeated by Bambi on WCW Worldwide. She then joined the Ladies Professional Wrestling Association and competed as Lady X. She defeated Susan Sexton on January 31, 1991, in Laughlin, Nevada, to win the LPWA Championship. At the LPWA Super Ladies Showdown pay-per-view event, she lost the LPWA Championship when she was defeated by Terri Power. After the LPWA closed, she returned to the independent circuit. She competed in the Women's Pro Wrestling organization in the early 1990s. In 1997, she briefly returned to WCW and became a contender for the WCW Women's Championship. While in WCW, she wrestled against her former AWA rival, Madusa, who was the number one contender at the time..

From 2000 to 2001, she wrestled as Thug in David McLane's televised Women of Wrestling promotion, where she frequently feuded with long-time rival Selina Majors (previously billed as Bambi). Thug defeated Majors in a steel cage match at the WOW Unleashed pay-per-view event. Off-camera, Majors and Thug served as trainers for the inexperienced talent.

On January 29, 2005, Leather appeared at Wrestle Reunion in an eight-woman tag team match (teaming with Sherri Martel, Krissy Vaine, and Amber O'Neal against Wendi Richter, Malia Hosaka, Bambi and Jenny Taylor).

Championships and accomplishments
 International Wrestling Association
 IWA Women's Championship (3 times)
 Ladies Major League Wrestling
 LMLW International Championship (1 time)
 Ladies Professional Wrestling Association
 LPWA Championship (1 time)
 National Wrestling Alliance
 NWA World Women's Championship (1 time)
 NWA Blue Ridge
 NWA Blue Ridge Women's Championship (1 time)
 National Wrestling League
 NWL Women's Championship (1 time)
 New Dimension Wrestling
 NDW Women's Championship (1 time)
 Women of Wrestling
 Princess Jasmine Trailblazer Award (2013)

References

External links
Peggy Lee Leather profile
Peggy Lee Leather as Lady X in LPWA
Peggy Lee Leather at IMDB

1959 births
20th-century professional wrestlers
21st-century American women
21st-century professional wrestlers
American female professional wrestlers
Living people
People from Taylor County, Georgia
Professional wrestlers from Georgia (U.S. state)
Professional wrestling trainers
Stampede Wrestling alumni
NWA World Women's Champions